Kilburn station may refer to:
Kilburn tube station, a London Underground station on the Jubilee line
Kilburn Park tube station, a London Underground station on the Bakerloo line
Kilburn High Road railway station, a London Overground station on the Watford DC line
Kilburn railway station, Adelaide, a TransAdelaide station on the Gawler railway line
Kilburn railway station, a former Midland Railway station in Derbyshire, England